Traveston railway station is located on the North Coast line in Queensland, Australia. It serves the town of Traveston.

History
Traveston station consists of one short platform that can only accommodate one carriage, requiring passengers to alight via the front door of services. A timber waiting room shelter is located behind the platform at ground level. Opposite the platform lies a crossing loop.

In 2010, the station was threatened with closure after the waiting room was deemed unsafe. However, in 2011 it was decided to restore the shelter, despite it being the least used station in South East Queensland with an average of four passengers per week.

Services
Traveston is serviced by two daily City network services in each direction.

1925 derailment disaster
On 9 June 1925, the Rockhampton Mail derailed near Traveston on a high timber trestle bridge. Ten people were killed and 48 injured when a passenger car and the luggage van plunged off the bridge, and another passenger car was pulled on its side. It resulted in baggage cars being specially built for passenger trains and ended the use of certain types of goods vehicles on passenger trains.

Services by platform

References

External links

Traveston station Queensland Rail
Traveston station Queensland's Railways on the Internet

North Coast railway line, Queensland
Regional railway stations in Queensland
Gympie Region